(Until now you have asked for nothing in My name), is a church cantata by Johann Sebastian Bach.

History and words 
Bach composed the cantata in Leipzig in his second annual cycle for the Fifth Sunday after Easter, called Rogate. The prescribed readings for the Sunday were from the Epistle of James, "doers of the word, not only listeners" and from the Gospel of John, from the farewell discourses of Jesus, "prayers will be fulfilled". In his second year Bach had composed chorale cantatas between the first Sunday after Trinity and Palm Sunday, but for Easter returned to cantatas on more varied texts, possibly because he lost his librettist. The cantata is the third of nine for the period between Easter and Pentecost based on texts of Christiana Mariana von Ziegler. Her cantatas for the period deal with "the understanding of Jesus' suffering within the context of victory and love, increasingly articulating how the tribulation of the world is overcome", according to American musicologist Eric Chafe.

The text begins, as do several others of the period, with a bass solo as the vox Christi delivering a quotation from the Gospel, verse 24. The poet interprets it as a reproach. The final lines from the second movement, an aria, are a paraphrase of another Gospel verse. One recitative is not part of the printed publication. Alfred Dürr assumes that Bach wrote it himself to improve the connection to the following Gospel quotation in movement 5. The poet used as the closing chorale the ninth stanza of Heinrich Müller's hymn "" (1659).

Bach first performed the cantata on 6 May 1725.

Scoring and structure 
The cantata in seven movements is scored for three vocal soloists (alto, tenor and bass), a four-part choir only for the closing chorale, two oboes, two oboes da caccia, two violins, viola and basso continuo.

 Arioso (bass): 
 Recitative (alto): 
 Aria (alto): 
 Recitative (tenor): 
 Arioso (bass): 
 Aria (tenor): 
 Chorale:

Music 
As in the cantata for the same occasion in Bach's first year in Leipzig, the text begins with words of Jesus from the gospel, sung by the bass as the vox Christi, accompanied by the strings, doubled by the oboes. It is formally free and untitled, but resembles a fugue because the instruments enter in imitation, and the voice sings a similar theme.

A secco recitative leads to an alto aria with two obbligato oboi da caccia. The prayer for forgiveness (Forgive, o Father, our guilt) is illustrated by sighing motifs. The second recitative is accompanied by the strings and ends in an arioso on the words "" (therefore seek to comfort me). In movement 5, the bass renders another word of Jesus from the Gospel, "" (In the world you have fear; however be comforted, I have conquered the world). The music is serious, the voice only accompanied by the continuo, referring to the Passion as the price for the "comfort". Christoph Wolff notes the "almost hymn-like emphasis through measured, arioso declamation ... In the central fifth movement Bach reduces the accompaniment to the continuo, another means of underscoring the importance of Jesus’ words." In response, the last aria expresses joy in suffering. Its pastoral mood, created by dotted rhythm in 12/8 time, has been compared to the Sinfonia beginning Part II of Bach's Christmas Oratorio. The closing chorale on the melody of "" by Johann Crüger is set for four parts.

Recordings 
 Les Grandes Cantates de J. S. Bach Vol. 5, Fritz Werner, Heinrich-Schütz-Chor Heilbronn, Pforzheim Chamber Orchestra, Hertha Töpper, Helmut Krebs, Franz Kelch, Erato 1959
 Bach Cantatas Vol. 2 – Easter, Karl Richter, Münchener Bach-Chor, Münchener Bach-Orchester, Anna Reynolds, Peter Schreier, Dietrich Fischer-Dieskau, Archiv Produktion 1974
 J. S. Bach: Das Kantatenwerk · Complete Cantatas · Les Cantates, Folge / Vol. 22, Nikolaus Harnoncourt, Tölzer Knabenchor, Concentus Musicus Wien, Paul Esswood, Kurt Equiluz, Ruud van der Meer, Teldec 1977
 Die Bach Kantate Vol. 34, Helmuth Rilling, Gächinger Kantorei, Bach-Collegium Stuttgart, Julia Hamari, Aldo Baldin, Walter Heldwein, Hänssler 1981
 Bach Edition Vol. 8 – Cantatas Vol. 3, Pieter Jan Leusink, Holland Boys Choir, Netherlands Bach Collegium, Sytse Buwalda, Nico van der Meel, Bas Ramselaar, Brilliant Classics 1999
 Bach Cantatas Vol. 25: Dresden/Sherborne / For the 5th Sunday after Easter (Rogate) / For the Sunday after Ascension Day (Exaudi), John Eliot Gardiner, Monteverdi Choir, English Baroque Soloists, Robin Tyson, Steve Davisilim, Stephan Loges, Soli Deo Gloria 2000
 J. S. Bach: Complete Cantatas Vol. 15, Ton Koopman, Amsterdam Baroque Orchestra & Choir, Bogna Bartosz, Jörg Dürmüller, Klaus Mertens, Antoine Marchand 2000
 J. S. Bach: Cantatas Vol. 35, Masaaki Suzuki, Bach Collegium Japan, Robin Blaze, Makoto Sakurada, Peter Kooy, BIS 2006

Notes

References

Sources 

 Bisher habt ihr nichts gebeten in meinem Namen BWV 87; BC A 74 / Sacred cantata (6th Sunday of Easter) Bach Digital
 Cantata BWV 87 Bisher habt ihr nichts gebeten in meinem Namen: history, scoring, sources for text and music, translations to various languages, discography, discussion, Bach Cantatas Website
 BWV 87 Bisher habt ihr nichts gebeten in meinem Namen: English translation, University of Vermont
 BWV 87 Bisher habt ihr nichts gebeten in meinem Namen: text, scoring, University of Alberta
 Luke Dahn: BWV 87.7 bach-chorales.com

Church cantatas by Johann Sebastian Bach
1725 compositions